Keisuke Fujiwara ( Fujiwara Keisuke,; born September 17, 1982) is a Japanese mixed martial artist with a background in kickboxing.

Biography

Kickboxing
While studying at art school, Fujiware joined Oguni-Gym to learn kickboxing.  He got a license as a professional kickboxer. In 2004, he moved to Akimoto Dojo Jungle Junction and started leaning MMA.

Debut in 3 rules
On November 23, 2006, Fujiwara made a debut in a grappling match of ZST. He fought against Masato Arai, but the bout was decided as a draw because of time over.

On August 26, 2007, he made a debut in a MMA match of ZST. He fought against Hitoshi Makino and won by submission with triangle choke.

On May 20, 2007, he knocked out Ichiro Sugita during the 1st round, and won the Genesis tournament at bantamweight in ZST.

On February 24, 2008, he made a debut in kickboxing match under shoot boxing rule against Tatsuya Umemiya. He won by TKO when he cut Umemiya's right eye during 1st round.

Winning first title
On May 24, 2009, he fought against Yukito for the vacant 1st bantamweight title of ZST. He won by TKO with punches and became the 1st champion.

On October 25, 2009, he was offered to fight against Tomoya Miyashita in DREAM, but lost by unanimous decision after 3rd round.

On February 20, 2010, he had a rematch against Shunichi Shimizu to defend his ZST title, and retained his title by decision after 5th round. After the bout, he announced that he wanted to challenge DREAM again.

On November 25, 2010, he fought against Mariusz Cieśliński, a Polish kickboxer, in Poland under K-1 rule, but lost by unanimous decision.

On February 6, 2011, he had a rematch against Toshihiro Shimizu to defend his ZST title, and retained his title by submission with triangle choke during 5th round.

On May 29, 2011, he challenged DREAM again to participate in the bantamweight tournament.

Fighting Records

Mixed martial arts record

|-
| Win
|align=center| 16–9–5
| Kohei Kuraoka
| TKO (punches)
| Zst 43: 12th Anniversary
| 
|align=center| 3
|align=center| 4:28
|Tokyo, Japan
|
|-
| Draw
|align=center| 15–9–5
| Alan Yoshihiro Yamaniwa
| Draw (time limit)
| Zst: Zst in Yokosuka Vol.1
| 
|align=center| 3
|align=center| 5:00
| Yokosuka, Japan
|
|-
| Loss
|align=center| 15–9–4
| Naohiro Mizuno
| Decision (Split)
| Shooto - 2nd Round 2014
| 
|align=center| 2
|align=center| 5:00
| Tokyo, Japan
|
|-
| Loss
|align=center| 15–8–4
| Ulka Sasaki
| Submission (rear-naked choke)
| Shooto - 1st Round 2014
| 
|align=center| 1
|align=center| 4:35
| Tokyo, Japan
|
|-
| Win
|align=center| 15–7–4
| Takumi Murata
| Decision (unanimous)
| ZST.37
| 
|align=center| 2
|align=center| 5:00
| Tokyo, Japan
|
|-
| Win
|align=center| 14–7–4
| Hideto Okada
| Decision (majority)
| ZST.36 
| 
|align=center| 2
|align=center| 5:00
| Tokyo, Japan
|
|-
| Loss
|align=center| 13–7–4
| Shunichi Shimizu
| Decision (unanimous)
| ZST.33 - 10th Anniversary
| 
|align=center| 2
|align=center| 5:00
| Tokyo, Japan
|
|-
| Loss
|align=center| 13–6–4
| Aslan Toktarbaev
| Decision (unanimous)
| Rings - Vol.2: Conquisito
| 
|align=center| 2
|align=center| 5:00
| Tokyo, Japan
|
|-
| Win
|align=center| 13–5–4
| Kenichi Ito
| TKO (corner stoppage)
| ZST - Battle Hazard 6
| 
|align=center| 2
|align=center| 5:00
| Tokyo, Japan
|
|-
| Win
|align=center| 12–5–4
| Tetsuya Fusano
| Decision (unanimous)
| ZST.31
| 
|align=center| 5
|align=center| 5:00
| Tokyo, Japan
|
|-
| Loss
|align=center| 11–5–4
| Melvin Blumer
| Decision (unanimous)
| ZST.30
| 
|align=center| 2
|align=center| 5:00
| Tokyo, Japan
|
|-
| Loss 
|align=center| 11–4–4
| Kenji Osawa 
| Decision (unanimous) 
| Dream.17 
|  
|align=center| 2 
|align=center| 5:00
| Tokyo, Japan 
|
|-
| Loss 
|align=center| 11–3–4
| Masakazu Imanari 
| Decision (unanimous) 
| Dream: Fight for Japan!
|  
|align=center| 2 
|align=center| 5:00
| Saitama, Saitama, Japan 
|
|-
| Win 
|align=center| 11–2–4
| Toshihiro Shimizu 
| Submission (triangle choke)
| ZST.27 
|  
|align=center| 5 
|align=center| 3:46
| Shinjuku, Tokyo, Japan 
|
|-
| Win 
|align=center| 10–2–4
| Naohiro Hasegawa 
| Submission (triangle choke)
| ZST.25 
|  
|align=center| 2 
|align=center| 2:06 
| Shinjuku, Tokyo, Japan 
|
|-
| Draw
|align=center| 9–2–4
| Tatsumitsu Wada 
| Draw 
| ZST Battle Hazard 04 
|  
|align=center| 2 
|align=center| 5:00 
| Shinjuku, Tokyo, Japan 
|
|-
| Win 
|align=center| 9–2–3
| Ichiro Sugita 
| KO (punch) 
| ZST.24 
|  
|align=center| 2 
|align=center| 1:20 
| Kōtō, Tokyo, Japan 
|
|-
| Win 
|align=center| 8–2–3
| Shunichi Shimizu
| Decision (unanimous) 
| ZST.23 
|  
|align=center| 5 
|align=center| 5:00
| Shinjuku, Tokyo, Japan 
|
|-
| Loss  
|align=center| 7–2–3
| Tomoya Miyashita 
| Decision (unanimous) 
| Dream 12 
|  
|align=center| 3 
|align=center| 5:00
| Osaka, Osaka, Japan 
|
|-
| Draw
|align=center| 7–1–3
| Wataru Inatsu 
| Draw
| ZST.21 
|  
|align=center| 2 
|align=center| 5:00
| Shinjuku, Tokyo, Japan 
|
|-
| Win  
|align=center| 7–1–2
| Yuichiro Shirai 
| TKO (punches)
| ZST.20 
|  
|align=center| 2 
|align=center| 4:37
| Kōtō, Tokyo, Japan 
|
|-
| Win  
|align=center| 6–1–2
| Ryosuke Tamura 
| KO (punch) 
| ZST.19
|  
|align=center| 2 
|align=center| 2:33
| Shinjuku, Tokyo, Japan 
|
|-
| Win 
|align=center| 5–1–2
| Shunichi Shimizu
| KO (punch) 
| ZST.18 
|  
|align=center| 2 
|align=center| 0:56
| Kōtō, Tokyo, Japan 
|
|-
| Win 
|align=center| 4–1–2
| Tokuaki Ninomiya 
| Submission (guillotine choke)
| ZST.15 
|  
|align=center| 1 
|align=center| 1:04
| Kōtō, Tokyo, Japan 
|
|-
| Loss 
|align=center| 3–1–2
| Ranki Kawana 
| TKO (doctor stoppage) 
| ZST.14 
|  
|align=center| 1 
|align=center| 2:59
| Kōtō, Tokyo, Japan 
|
|-
| Win 
|align=center| 3–0–2
| Toshihiro Shimizu 
| Submission (triangle choke)
| ZST SWAT! 13 
|  
|align=center| 2 
|align=center| 1:22
| Tokyo, Japan 
|
|-
| Draw
|align=center| 2–0–2
| Ranki Kawana 
| Draw 
| ZST.13 
|  
|align=center| 2 
|align=center| 5:00
| Kōtō, Tokyo, Japan 
|
|-
| Win 
|align=center| 2–0–1
| Ichiro Sugita 
| KO (front kick) 
| ZST SWAT! 11, Tournament Final 
|  
|align=center| 1 
|align=center| 0:29
| Ōta, Tokyo, Japan 
|
|-
| Win 
|align=center| 1–0–1
| Satoshi Shinhori 
| Decision (unanimous)
| ZST SWAT! 10, Tournament Semi-final 
|  
|align=center| 2 
|align=center| 5:00
| Ota, Tokyo, Japan 
|
|-
| Draw
|align=center| 0–0–1
| Hitoshi Makino 
| Draw 
| ZST SWAT! 09 
|  
|align=center| 2 
|align=center| 5:00
| Ōta, Tokyo, Japan 
|

Professional grappling

|-  bgcolor="#c5d2ea"
| 2006-11-23 || Draw ||align=left| Masato Arai || ZST.11 || Kōtō, Tokyo, Japan || Time Over || 1 || 5:00
|-
| colspan=9 | Legend:

Professional kickboxing

|-  bgcolor="#FFBBBB"
| 2010-11-25 || Loss ||align=left| Mariusz Cieśliński || KOK World GP 2010 in Warsaw || Warsaw, Poland || Decision (Unanimous) || 3 || 3:00
|-  bgcolor="#FFBBBB"
| 2008-09-12 || Loss ||align=left| Koya Shimada || Shoot boxing 2008 Road to S-cup 5 || Tokyo, Japan || Decision (Unanimous) || 3 || 3:00
|-  bgcolor="#CCFFCC"
| 2008-06-28 || Win ||align=left| Akihiro Okuwa || Shoot boxing Young Caesar Cup 2007 || Tokyo, Japan || Decision (Unanimous) || 3 || 2:00
|-  bgcolor="#c5d2ea"
| 2008-05-18 || Draw ||align=left| Akihiro Okuwa || ZST.17 || Tokyo, Japan || Time Over || 2 || 3:00
|-  bgcolor="#CCFFCC"
| 2008-02-24 || Win ||align=left| Tatsuya Uematsu || ZST.16 || Tokyo, Japan || TKO (Cut) || 1 || 1:58
|-
| colspan=9 | Legend:

Titles
ZST Genesis Tournament 2007 Bantamweight winner
ZST Bantamweight champion

References

External links

Official blog
Profile from Akimoto Dojo Jungle Junction

1982 births
Living people
Sportspeople from Saitama Prefecture
Japanese male mixed martial artists
Bantamweight mixed martial artists
Mixed martial artists utilizing kickboxing
Japanese male kickboxers